La Neuville-en-Hez is a commune in the Oise department in northern France.

The commune is located 60 km north of Paris, less than 18 km east of Beauvais, 36 km west of Compiegne and 54 km south of Amiens.

The village formed around the twelfth-century castle built by Count Raoul de Clermont, some of which remains.

It contains the  Church of Our Lady of the Nativity, dating from the  thirteenth century and the convent of Notre Dame de la Garde dating from the fifteenth century.

A statue to King Louis IX of France commemorates the legend that the saint king was born here.

See also
 Communes of the Oise department

References

External links

  La Neuville-en-Hez Official website

Communes of Oise